Cactobrosis is a genus of snout moths in the subfamily Phycitinae. It was erected by Harrison Gray Dyar Jr. in 1914. Some sources list it as a synonym of Zophodia, while others retain it as a valid genus.

Species
 Cactobrosis fernaldialis (Hulst, 1886) 
 Cactobrosis insignatella Dyar, 1914 
 Cactobrosis longipennella (Hampson, 1901)
 Cactobrosis maculifera Dyar, 1914

References

Phycitini
Pyralidae genera